William Rees Rush (1857–1940) was an officer in the United States Navy during the Spanish–American War, the 1914 United States occupation of Veracruz, and World War I, and was a recipient of the Medal of Honor and the Navy Cross.

Biography

Early career
William Rees Rush was born in Philadelphia, Pennsylvania, on September 19, 1857. He took the oath of office as a midshipman on June 6, 1872, graduated from the United States Naval Academy on June 20, 1877, and was commissioned ensign on October 15, 1881. He also received instruction in ordnance at the Washington Navy Yard in Washington, D.C., worked in the Navy Hydrographic Office, completed the course of instruction at the Naval Torpedo Station at Newport, Rhode Island, and attended the Naval War College at Newport.

Spanish–American War
During the Spanish–American War in 1898, Rush served as a turret division commander in the armored cruiser , the flagship of Rear Admiral Winfield S. Schley's Flying Squadron during blockade operations off Cienfuegos, Cuba, and participated in the Battle of Santiago de Cuba on July 3, 1898.

Service, 1899–1914
Detached from Brooklyn in October 1899, Rush went to sea in the battleship  as executive officer. He later commanded the gunboat  and served as executive officer in the protected cruiser .

In the ensuing years, Rush again alternated tours of duty afloat with assignments ashore. He served at the Boston Navy Yard in Boston, Massachusetts, in the equipment department and at the Naval War College and travelled to the Philippines where he became captain of Cavite Navy Yard in February 1906.

Medal of Honor at Veracruz
While commanding Florida, Rush was given command of the landing party at Veracruz, Mexico.  The landings there on 21 April 1914, were at the height of a diplomatic crisis between Mexico and the United States. Rush and his men met heavy resistance, Rush was wounded in the early fighting, but continued to direct the efforts of his brigade.

For his conduct during the Veracruz landings, Captain Rush received the Medal of Honor. His citation took note of the fact that he was required to be at points of great danger in directing the officers and men of the brigade and that in doing so he exhibited "conspicuous courage, coolness, and skill." "His responsibilities were great," the citation continued, "and he met them in a manner worthy of commendation."

Boston Navy Yard and World War I service
Rush took command of the Boston Navy Yard on November 6, 1914, a post he held until he requested retirement on October 9, 1916. With the onset of World War I in April 1917, however, Rush was recalled to active duty and was awarded the Navy Cross for "exceptionally meritorious services in a duty of great responsibility" as commandant of the Boston Navy Yard during World War I.

Retirement and later life
Relieved of all active duty on July 25, 1919, Rush subsequently lived in retirement in Italy. He died at Pallanza, Italy, on October 2, 1940.

Namesakes
During World War II, the U.S. Navy destroyer escort  was named for Captain Rush. Her construction was cancelled in March 1944.

The destroyer escort  then was named for Rush. Her construction was cancelled in June 1944.

The destroyer , in commission from 1945 to 1978, was named in his honor.

Medal of Honor citation
Rank and organization: Captain, U.S. Navy. Born: September 19, 1857, Philadelphia, Pa. Accredited to: Pennsylvania. G.O. No.: 177, December 4, 1915. Other Navy award: Distinguished Service Medal.

Citation:

For distinguished conduct in battle, engagements of Vera Cruz, 21 and April 22, 1914. In command of the naval brigade, Capt. Rush was in both days' fighting and almost continually under fire from soon after landing, about noon on the 21st, until we were in possession of the city, about noon of the 22d. His duties required him to be at points of great danger in directing his officers and men, and he exhibited conspicuous courage, coolness and skill in his conduct of the fighting. Upon his courage and skill depended in great measure success or failure. His responsibilities were great, and he met them in a manner worthy of commendation.

See also

 List of Medal of Honor recipients (Veracruz)

References

 
 
 

United States Navy officers
United States Naval Academy alumni
1857 births
1940 deaths
United States Navy Medal of Honor recipients
Recipients of the Navy Cross (United States)
United States Navy personnel of World War I
Military personnel from Philadelphia
Battle of Veracruz (1914) recipients of the Medal of Honor